CTN Cash and Carry Ltd v Gallaher Ltd [1993] EWCA Civ 19 is an English contract law case relating to duress. It raised the question whether an act could be considered to be economic duress if the act would in any event be lawful.

Facts
CTN Cash and Carry Ltd had a dispute with Gallaher Ltd about whether CTN should pay for some cigarettes that were delivered to the wrong warehouse and got stolen before Gallaher Ltd could pick them up again and take them to another warehouse. Gallaher believed that CTN was liable, because the risk of any had already passed, and threatened to withdraw CTN's credit facility for future dealings. They were entitled to do this for any reason. CTN paid. Later it was determined that the risk of the lost cigarettes was not on CTN and they sued for repayment.

Judgment
Steyn LJ held that the threatened withdrawal of future credit was not duress, but he expressly refrained from saying there could never be ‘lawful act duress’ in a commercial context. He said the move would be a ‘radical one with far-reaching implications… introduce a substantial and undesirable element of uncertainty in the commercial bargaining process.’
‘It is an unattractive result, inasmuch as the defendants are allowed to retain a sum which at the trial they became aware was not in truth due to them. But in my view the law compels the result.’

See also

English contract law
Lloyds Bank Ltd v Bundy [1975] QB 326
Williams v. Walker-Thomas Furniture Co. 350 F.2d 445 (C.A. D.C. 1965)

Notes

References

English unconscionability case law
English duress case law
Court of Appeal (England and Wales) cases
1993 in case law
1993 in British law